State Highway 356 runs from State Highway 183 in Irving, Texas to Interstate 35E in Dallas, Texas.

Route description
SH 356 begins at a junction with SH 183 in Irving.  It heads east from this junction through Irving to an intersection with Loop 12.  SH 356 reaches its eastern terminus at I-35E in Dallas.

It is known locally as Irving Boulevard for most of its length; a small section on the eastern end is designated as Commonwealth Boulevard, which connects Irving Boulevard to I-35E.  It runs through downtown Irving and a heavily industrialized portion of Dallas between the Trinity River and State Highway 183.

History
SH 356 was designated on August 8, 1946, running from State Highway 1 (Commerce Street) near the Triple Underpass (where Elm, Main and Commerce Streets meet) to SH 183 in Irving, replacing FM 684. The highway's eastern terminus was relocated to I-35E on August 28, 1958. The section of SH 356 between Sowers Road and Lee Street was removed from the state highway system and turned over to the city of Irving on October 30, 2003. On November 20, 2008, the section of SH 356 from the Trinity River Levee to I-35E was cancelled.

Junction list

References

356
Transportation in Irving, Texas
Highways in Dallas
Transportation in Dallas County, Texas